I'm Totally Fine is a 2022 science-fiction comedy film.

Plot 
Vanessa embarks on a solo trip after the death of her
best friend Jennifer. But her self-care plans change
when she finds Jennifer standing in her kitchen, claiming to be an
extraterrestrial.

Cast 
 Jillian Bell: Vanessa
 Natalie Morales: Jennifer
 Blake Anderson: Eric
 Harvey Guillén: DJ Twisted Bristle
 Kyle Newacheck
 Karen Maruyama: Sandra

Production 
I'm Totally Fine was announced in February 2021. The story was conceived from the director's experiences of Covid-19, who struggled with uncertainty and anxiety but was "present and happy again" once he accepted he had no control.

Release 
I'm Totally Fine was released November 4, 2022.

Reception 

  

RogerEbert.com rated the film 3 out of 4 and commented: "The best sci-fi illuminates darker corners of the human condition and screenwriter Alisha Ketry has crafted a sci-fi context illustrating the destabilizing experience of grief in thought-provoking ways."

Noel Murray from The Los Angeles Times wrote a positive review: "The leads have a wonderful chemistry, with Bell hitting the right notes of anger and confusion and Morales maintaining the alien’s comic deadpan. Everyone involved has clearly thought through how such a wild fantasy situation might play out — and more importantly, how it would feel."

Nadir Samara of Screen Rant argues the film has adequate production and performances, but lacks the spark needed for "a fun, sci-fi dramedy" and lacks chemistry between the lead characters.

References

External links 
 

2020s American films
2020s English-language films
2022 science fiction films